The Harrogate Pullman was a named passenger train operating in the United Kingdom.

History

The Harrogate Pullman was introduced into service by the London and North Eastern Railway and began operating in 1923 between London King’s Cross and Newcastle, via Harrogate and Ripon.

It comprised 12 new specially-built Pullman cars costing £70,000 for the service. The supplement to travel on the service was 10s 1st class and 6s 3rd class.

In 1928 it was renamed the West Riding Pullman which in 1935 became the Yorkshire Pullman.

In 1928 it became Queen of Scots.

References

Named passenger trains of the London and North Eastern Railway
Rail transport in North Yorkshire
Railway services introduced in 1923
1923 establishments in England
Transport in Harrogate